Nthabiseng Mokoena is a prominent South African intersex activist and an advisory board member for the first intersex human rights fund.

Early life 
Mokoena describes how she was born with both male and female sexual characteristics, and struggled with shame and identity. Her mother was supportive, despite suffering blame and stigma for her different child. For Mokoena, meeting other intersex people helped to overcome feelings of shame.

Mokoena declined free clitoris reduction surgery aimed at creating a more feminine genital appearance. In doing so, Mokoena would have been a clinical case study, but she found this to be degrading. Mokoena says:

Activism 

In 2011, Mokoena joined Transgender and Intersex Africa, initially as a board member and then later becoming Advocacy Coordinator. The organisation promotes the rights of transgender and intersex persons in rural areas and townships in South Africa. She is currently the Regional Training and Capacity Strengthening Officer for the AIDS and Rights Alliance of Southern and East Africa.

In 2015, Mokoena joined an international advisory board for a first philanthropic Intersex Human Rights Fund established by the Astraea Lesbian Foundation for Justice.

Selected bibliography

See also 
 Intersex rights in South Africa

References 

Living people
Intersex women
Intersex rights activists
South African LGBT rights activists
Intersex rights in South Africa
Year of birth missing (living people)
Intersex writers